Niras Haroon (born 27 January 1942) is a Thai weightlifter. He competed in the men's lightweight event at the 1964 Summer Olympics.

References

1942 births
Living people
Niras Haroon
Niras Haroon
Weightlifters at the 1964 Summer Olympics
Place of birth missing (living people)
Weightlifters at the 1966 Asian Games
Niras Haroon
Niras Haroon